The Red Ceiling is a photograph by William Eggleston. Its formal title is Greenwood, Mississippi.  Eggleston took the photo at the home of his friend Dr. Thomas Chester Boring, Jr., at 508 Macarthur St. in Greenwood, Mississippi. 

Eggleston considers it among his most challenging and powerful works, "so powerful that, in fact, I've never seen it reproduced on the page to my satisfaction".

A copy of the photograph is held by the J. Paul Getty Museum, but is currently not on view at the Getty Center. Another copy is held by the Museum of Modern Art.

It has been described as Eggleston's "most famous photograph," with "some indefinable sense of menace". It is widely recognised as the album cover for the record Radio City (1974) by the Memphis band Big Star.

References

Color photographs
1973 works
1973 in art
Photographs of the United States
1970s photographs

4.  Jane Flowers  The True Legacy of Dr Tom         Boring, An Unsolved Murder Mystery Biography, published June 18, 2020